Pot drum may  refer to:

Kettle drum, a broad class of drums with a rounded bottom
Membranophone, any musical instrument which produces sound by vibration of a stretched membrane